Chongqing–Xinjiang–Europe railway, abbreviated as Yu–Xin–Ou railway, is a freight rail route linking Chongqing in Southwestern China, with Duisburg, Germany. The name 渝新欧 is an acronym, consisting of Yu (渝, Chongqing), Xin (新, Xinjiang), Ou (欧, Europe).

It passes through the Dzungarian Gate into Kazakhstan, and moves through Russia, Belarus and Poland before arriving in Duisburg. The railway is part of a growing rail network connecting China and Europe along the New Silk Road.

Background
According to the European Commission, as of March 2014, the EU is China's biggest trading partner.
Rail transport is becoming increasingly important for trade between Europe and China as the latter promotes industrial hubs in cities further inland in its territory.

Route in China
 Chongqing
 Chengdu
 Xi'an
 Lanzhou
 Ürümqi

Operators

The Yuxinou train is operated by YUXINOU (Chongqing) Logistics Co., Ltd, a joint venture between RZD Logistika JSC, Russia, the YUXINOU (Chongqing) Supply Chain Management Co., Ltd. and the China Railways International Multimodal Transport Company Ltd. (CRIMT), both from the People's Republic of China, the Kazakhstan Temir Zholy, the national railway company of Kazakhstan, and the DB Schenker China Ltd, a subsidiary of Deutsche Bahn.

Customers and Usage

Most goods transported via this route are from multinational IT companies in Chongqing. One of these is technological giant Foxconn who supplies Hewlett-Packard, Acer Inc. and Apple Inc.

Statistics

The 11,179 km route takes 13
to 16
days to reach Duisburg from Chongqing, compared to the 36-day container ship transport time as well as being safer and less expensive, according to Chongqing authorities.

From January to November, 2012, a total of 40 freight trains ran on the Yuxinou Railway, transporting 1747 containers with 21,000 tons cargo, and worth of 1.15 billion USD. The freight included 3.062 million laptops and 564,000 liquid crystal display screens.

In 2012, the train, "roughly eight football fields [800 yards or meters] long", ran weekly. In early 2014 it runs three times weekly and, "to accommodate a sevenfold increase volume since 2012 -- soon will go daily". An article by the investor news website 'Seeking Alpha' predicted that by 2020 trade from China to Germany could surpass that from the Netherlands and France, Germany's top two trading partners in 2014.

In 2018, around 30 trains ran every week, 10 times more than in 2014.

See also

Silk Road
Chinese trade#Trading partners
China–European Union relations#Trade
Transiberian Railway
Yiwu–Madrid railway line
Yiwu–London railway line

References

External links
 Riding the New Silk Road (NYT Newsgraphic) by Shan Carter, Hannah Fairfield, and Derek Watkins. Photography and video by James Hill
CCTV News (Youtube video) Uploaded by Abdi Ali
Germany's 'China City': how Duisburg became Xi Jinping's gateway to Europe with map of the railway.

Railway companies of China
China–Germany relations